Shalva Papuashvili (born 26 January 1976) is a Georgian politician who has served as a member of the Georgian parliament since 2020  and as Speaker of Parliament since 29 December 2021.

Biography
 GIZ, Head of Georgia Team (2017–2020)
 GIZ, Deputy Program Manager (2015–2017)
 Ilia State University, School of Law, Associate Professor (2015 – )
 Caucasus University, School of Law, Associate Professor (2012–2015)
 GIZ, Head of Group (2007–2015)
 Civil Council for Defense and Security, Expert for Human Rights (2005–2006)
 GIZ, Senior Legal Expert (2003–2007)
 Saarland University, Doctoral Student (Dr. iur.) (2000–2002)
 Law Firm “Heimes&Muller”, Assistant to the Lawyer (2000–2001)
 Saarland University, Master's Student (LL.M.) (1998–1999)
 Assistant to the Member of the Parliament of Georgia (1996–1998)

External links
 Parliament of Georgia

References

1976 births
Living people
Speakers of the Parliament of Georgia
Georgian Dream politicians
Members of the Parliament of Georgia
21st-century politicians from Georgia (country)